Pigeon Hill is a small mountain chain located in Central New York region of New York located northeast of Burlington, New York. It is made by four main peaks with the highest being 2057 feet.

References

Mountains of Otsego County, New York
Mountains of New York (state)